Early general elections were held in Gibraltar on 23 June 1972. The result was a victory for the Association for the Advancement of Civil Rights, which won eight of the 15 seats in the House of Assembly.

Background
The 1969 elections had seen the Association for the Advancement of Civil Rights emerge as the largest party in the legislature, winning seven of the 15 seats. However, the opposition Integration with Britain Party and the Isola Group between them held eight seats, and were able to form a government. In 1972 a member of the Isola Group defected, resulting in early elections being called.

Electoral system
The electoral system for the House of Assembly allowed each voter to vote for up to eight candidates.

Results

References

Gibraltar
General
General elections in Gibraltar
Election and referendum articles with incomplete results
June 1972 events in Europe